KHTS may refer to:

 KHTS (AM), a radio station (1220 AM) licensed to Canyon Country, California, United States
 KHTS-FM, a radio station (93.3 FM) licensed to El Cajon, California, United States
 the ICAO code for Tri-State Airport